The Symphony Orchestra of India is a symphony orchestra based in Mumbai, India. It was founded in 2006 by the National Centre for the Performing Arts (NCPA), Mumbai, which is also its home.

The founding Music Director is Marat Bisengaliev. Zane Dalal is the Associate Music Director. Evgeny Bushkov is the current Resident Conductor. 

The orchestra's season includes not only works from the symphonic repertoire but also opera, ballet and chamber music performances.

About the Orchestra

The Symphony Orchestra of India (SOI), based at the National Centre for the Performing Arts (NCPA), Mumbai, is India's first and only professional orchestra. It was founded in 2006 by NCPA Chairman Khushroo N. Suntook and internationally renowned violin virtuoso Marat Bisengaliev, who serves as the Orchestra's Music Director. Zane Dalal was appointed Associate Music Director of the SOI in September 2014, following serving seven years as Resident Conductor. Evgeny Bushkov serves as the Resident Conductor, taking up the role in January 2017.

The SOI has worked with renowned conductors including Charles Dutoit, Martyn Brabbins, Carlo Rizzi, Augustin Dumay, Yuri Simonov, Lior Shambadal, Rafael Payare, Adrian Leaper, Johannes Wildner, Evgeny Bushkov, Duncan Ward, Karl Jenkins, Mischa Damev, Alexander Anisimov, and Christoph Poppen, and more. Soloists appearing with the SOI have included Maria João Pires, Augustin Dumay, Simon O'Neill, Cédric Tiberghien, Alina Ibragimova, Barry Douglas, Angel Blue, Zakir Hussain, Edgar Meyer, Béla Fleck, Tamás Vásáry, and Lena Neudauer, amongst others.

In the decade since its inception, the Orchestra has performed around India and internationally. Tours have seen the SOI perform in the Hall of Columns, Moscow, and the Royal Opera House, Muscat. In the October 2015, the SOI opened the 2015-16 Abu Dhabi Classics season, performing at the Emirates Palace Auditorium, Abu Dhabi, and in January 2016, presented three concerts in Switzerland—at the Tonhalle, Zurich; Victoria Hall, Geneva; and the Tonhalle, St. Gallen—on invitation from the Migros Kulturprozent Classics series. Apart from the mainstays of the symphonic repertoire, the NCPA and SOI have also presented large-scale productions, including fully staged operas—with productions of Tosca, Madama Butterfly, and Cavalleria rusticana/Pagliacci. In 2017, the SOI premiered an innovative new production of La Bohème, conducted by Carlo Rizzi.

The Orchestra's core group of musicians is resident at the NCPA all year round and forms the SOI Chamber Orchestra, which performs a regular series of concerts through the year. Additional players are recruited from a talented pool of professionals from around the world. The SOI features a growing number of Indian players, representing the finest home-grown talent, which provides a solid foundation for the future of orchestral playing in the country.

The Orchestra places great emphasis on education and many of the SOI musicians are also teachers, working to develop the musical potential amongst young people in India. Chief amongst the Orchestra's educational initiatives is the NCPA Special Music Training Programme, which brings a professional level of teaching, previously not available in India, to gifted young musicians, with the aim of growing the number of Indian musicians in the SOI in the near future.

The creation of first-class cultural institutions working towards international recognition is a vital component of India's growing prestige on the world stage. Moreover, the SOI is fulfilling an important cultural and educational role within India. The NCPA continues to grow as a centre of musical excellence, developing international standards of professionalism among its musicians, thereby addressing the aspirations of young musicians and music-loving audiences throughout India.

Guest Conductors

List of guest conductors who have conducted the Symphony Orchestra of India:

 Adrian Leaper
 Alexander Anisimov
 Augustin Dumay
 Charles Dutoit
 Christoph Poppen
 Duncan Ward
 Evgeny Bushkov
 Johannes Wildner
 Karl Jenkins
 Lior Shambadal
 Mischa Damev
 Martyn Brabbins
 Rafael Payare
 Yuri Simonov

Guest Artistes

 Alina Ibragimova, violin
 Angel Blue, soprano
 Augustin Dumay, violin
 Barry Douglas, piano
 Béla Fleck, banjo
 Cédric Tiberghien, piano
 Edgar Meyer, double bass
 Lena Neudauer, violin
 Maria João Pires, piano
 Simon O'Neill, tenor
 Stephen Kovacevich, piano
 Tamás Vásáry, piano
 Zakir Hussain, tabla

International touring

 Moscow: June 2010
 Muscat: February 2013
 Abu Dhabi: October 2015
 Switzerland: January 2016

Music Directors 

 Marat Bisengaliev (2006 – present)

NCPA Special Music Training Programme 
The NCPA Special Music Training Programme was launched in 2012, to offer an advanced level of music training, previously not available in India, to talented young children. Under the supervision of SOI Music Director Marat Bisengaliev, the students receive a holistic music education that is inspired by the Russian Conservatoire method. This includes substantial one-to-one tuition on the student’s primary instrument, as well as second-study piano lessons, music history, music theory, and group-singing teaching via the Solfeggio method. The Programme currently offers lessons on all the string instruments, select woodwind and brass instruments, piano, and percussion, with plans to expand the offerings in the near future. The tutors of the Programme are all professional musicians trained in Europe and the United States, and are all full-time members of the Symphony Orchestra of India. Amongst other performance opportunities, each year the NCPA presents a special concert featuring students of the Programme performing with members of the Symphony Orchestra of India. This offers the students the rare opportunity to perform as a soloist with a professional orchestra, as well as training in orchestral playing. In March 2018, students of the NCPA Special Music Training Programme embarked on their first international tour, performing two concerts in Abu Dhabi.

Press Coverage

Pitch Perfect I 11 July 2014 I DNA
India’s Only Symphony Orchestra I 20 Sept 2012
Huffington Post

References

External links
Symphony Orchestra of India - official website

Indian orchestras
Musical groups established in 2006
Culture of Mumbai
Symphony orchestras
2006 establishments in Maharashtra